Corfe Castle Hundred was a hundred in the county of Dorset, England, containing only the parish of Corfe Castle.

It was sometimes also referred to as Corfe Castle Liberty.

See also
List of hundreds in Dorset
List of liberties in Dorset

Sources
Boswell, Edward, 1833: The Civil Division of the County of Dorset (published on CD by Archive CD Books Ltd, 1992)
Hutchins, John, History of Dorset, vols 1-4 (3rd ed 1861–70; reprinted by EP Publishing, Wakefield, 1973)
Mills, A. D., 1977, 1980, 1989: Place Names of Dorset, parts 1–3. English Place Name Society: Survey of English Place Names vols LII, LIII and 59/60

Hundreds of Dorset
Liberties of Dorset
Corfe Castle